Andal Venkatasubba Rao (1894–1969), popularly known as Aandaalamma, was an Indian social worker, educationist and the co-founder of Madras Seva Sadan, a Chennai-based charitable organization working for the welfare of women and children.

Born in 1894 in Chennai, the capital city of the south Indian state of Tamil Nadu, she did her early schooling at Holy Angels Anglo Indian Higher Secondary School and the Presidency Girls' High School, Madras. In 1928, she married M. Venkatasubba Rao, a judge at Madras High Court who would later be knighted by the British Queen, The couple founded Madras Seva Sadan, a charitable organization, the same year. The organization was started with a capital of  10,000. With the help of 8 orphan girls, the organization has grown over the years to a large welfare organization attending to the needs of around many women and children. The Sadan also run a higher secondary school, Lady Andal Venkatasubba Rao Matriculation Higher Secondary School, and a concert hall by name, Sir Mutha Venkatasubba Rao Concert Hall. The Government of India awarded her the third highest civilian honour of the Padma Bhushan, in 1957, for her contributions to society. She died in 1969, at the age of 75.

References

External links 
 

Recipients of the Padma Bhushan in social work
1894 births
1969 deaths
Scholars from Chennai
Social workers
20th-century Indian educational theorists
Indian women educational theorists
Women educators from Tamil Nadu
Educators from Tamil Nadu
Social workers from Tamil Nadu
20th-century women educators
20th-century Indian women